Ransford is a given name and a surname. Notable people with the name include:

Given name:
Ransford Addo (born 1983), football player from Ghana
Ransford Brempong (born 1981), Canadian professional basketball player
Ransford D. Bucknam (1866–1919), Nova Scotian who became a Pasha, admiral in the Turkish navy and vice-admiral to the Turkish empire
Ransford Doherty, American actor
Erasmus Ransford Tawiah Madjitey, CBE (1920–1996), Ghanaian police officer, diplomat and politician
Ransford Koufie (born 2002), Ghanaian professional footballer
Ransford Osei (born 1990), professional footballer
Ransford Selasi (born 1996), Ghanaian professional footballer
Ransford Smith, CD (born 1949), senior public servant from Jamaica
Ransford-Yeboah Königsdörffer (born 2001), Ghanaian professional footballer
Homer Ransford Watson (1855–1936), Canadian landscape painter

Surname:
Charles Ransford, M.D., British physician, Fellow of the Royal College of Physicians of Edinburgh, early advocate of homoeopathic medicine
Edwin Ransford (1805–1876), English singer and composer
James Ransford (1884–1929), English footballer
Maurice Ransford (1896–1968), American art director
Tessa Ransford (1938–2015), poet and founder of the Scottish Poetry Library in 1984
Thomas Ransford Ph.D. Sc.D (born 1958), British-born Canadian mathematician, researching in spectral theory and complex analysis
Vernon Ransford (1885–1958), Australian cricketer

See also
Mashreghi-Ransford inequality
Bransford
Cransford
Rainsford
Raynsford